Albert Désiré Vandeplancke (2 January 1911 – 1 April 1939) was a French water polo player and freestyle swimmer who competed at the 1928 Summer Olympics. He won a bronze medal with the French water polo team, and failed to reach the finals of the 400 metre and 4×200 metre swimming events.

See also
 List of Olympic medalists in water polo (men)

References
 Albert Vandeplancke's obituary

External links
 

1911 births
1939 deaths
Sportspeople from Tourcoing
French male water polo players
French male freestyle swimmers
Olympic water polo players of France
Olympic swimmers of France
Water polo players at the 1928 Summer Olympics
Swimmers at the 1928 Summer Olympics
Olympic bronze medalists for France
Olympic bronze medalists in water polo
Medalists at the 1928 Summer Olympics
French people of Flemish descent
20th-century French people